Gawhar Khatun (also spelled Gowhar, Gohar, Jauhar, and Jawhar), known in other sources as Mahd-i Iraq (“the bride from Persian Iraq”), was a Seljuq princess who during an unknown date married the Ghaznavid Sultan Mas'ud III of Ghazni (r. 1099–1115), thus becoming his second wife.

Biography 
Gawhar was the daughter of Sultan Malik-Shah I, and lived in Persian Iraq, until she was in 1073 betrothed to Mas'ud III, and married the latter. According to some sources, Gawhar was the mother of Mas'ud III's son Arslan-Shah, while some other sources states that she was his stepmother. Nevertheless, during Arslan-Shah's reign, Gawhar was treated badly, which resulted in her brother Ahmad Sanjar to invade Arslan-Shah's domains, where he managed to decisively defeat Arslan-Shah and make the latter's brother Bahram-Shah the new ruler of the Ghaznavid dynasty, while at the same time acknowledging Seljuq suzerainty. After this event, Gawhar is no longer mentioned in any source, and later died during an unknown date in the 12th-century.

References

Sources 
 

 

11th-century births
11th-century Turkic women
12th-century deaths
12th-century Turkic women
Princesses
Seljuk dynasty
Turkic female royalty